This is the list of major streets in Pärnu, Estonia. The list is incomplete.

See also
List of streets in Narva
List of streets in Tallinn
List of streets in Tartu

References 

Streets in Estonia
Pärnu
Parnu